Termitomyces microcarpus is a species of agaric fungus in the family Lyophyllaceae. An edible species, it is found in Africa and Asia, where it grows in groups or clusters in deciduous forests near the roots of bamboo stumps associated with termite nests.

Nutrition
A 2017 study which compared the amino acid profile of 13 edible wild mushrooms in Yunnan, China found that T. microcarpus had the largest amount of total amino acids as well as essential amino acids.

References

Lyophyllaceae
Fungi described in 1871
Fungi of Africa
Fungi of Asia
Taxa named by Miles Joseph Berkeley
Taxa named by Christopher Edmund Broome